Trefaldighetskyrkan may refer to:
a Swedish word meaning Holy Trinity Church, that sounds similar to the Norwegian word for the same, Trefoldighetskirken.

In Sweden 
Trinity Church (Karlskrona) (Trefaldighetskyrkan)
Trinity Church, Halmstad (Trefaldighetskyrkan)
Trinity Church, Kristianstad (Trefaldighetskyrkan)

In Norway 
 Trinity Church (Arendal) (Trefoldighetskirken)
 Trinity Church (Oslo) (Trefoldighetskirken)